Flashing Spurs is a 1924 American silent Western film directed by B. Reeves Eason and starring Bob Custer, Edward Coxen, and Marguerite Clayton, who has a dual role of twin sisters. A Texas Ranger investigates a woman he believes is mixed up with a gang of outlaws.

Plot
As described in a review in a film magazine, while following a clue, Sargent Stuart (Custer) of the Rangers goes to the city and has a fight with two thugs, Frazier (Bennett) and Scarbee (Hayes), and is overpowered. He makes an escape by crawling into the window of the room of Rena Holden (Clayton), and is impressed by her. Returning later, he finds that she is gone and a letter indicates she is a crook, a member of Steve Clammert's (Coxen) gang, which is planning to rob miner John Holden (Malan). Stuart goes to the mine and sees Ruth Holden (Clayton) and, believing her to be her twin sister Rena, denounces her. Clammert's gang captures him and prepares to kill him when the side of a hill is blown up, but the explosive misfires and he survives. John and Rena, who is masquerading as Ruth, rescue him, and she confesses the plot. They arrive at Clammert's shack in time to rescue Ruth from an attack by Clammert, but Rena is injured during the fight. John forgives Rena, and when she recovers she agrees to become Mrs. Stuart.

Cast

Preservation
With no prints of Flashing Spurs located in any film archives, it is a lost film.

References

Bibliography
 Langman, Larry. A Guide to Silent Westerns. Greenwood Publishing Group, 1992.

External links
 

1924 films
1924 Western (genre) films
Films directed by B. Reeves Eason
American black-and-white films
Film Booking Offices of America films
Silent American Western (genre) films
1920s English-language films
1920s American films